The Essential Collection may refer to:

The Essential Collection (ABBA album)
The Essential Collection: 1965–1997, an album by the Carpenters
The Essential Collection (Duran Duran album)
The Essential Collection (Kirsty MacColl album)
The Essential Collection (1975–1982), an album by Poco
The Essential Collection 1995–2005, an album by Ten
The Essential Collection (Tammi Terrell album)
The Essential Collection (Muddy Waters album)